The Governors of San Juan Province, Argentina since Argentina became independent have been the following

Lieutenant governors

Governors from 1820 to 1884

Governors from 1875 to 1930

Governors from 1930 to 1958

Governors from 1958 to 1983

Governors since 1983

Sources 
Gobiernos provinciales desde 1930 hasta 1958 Fundacion Bataller
Gobiernos provinciales desde 1958 a 1983, Fundacion Bataller
Gobiernos provinciales desde 1983, Fundación Bataller

References 

Governors of San Juan Province, Argentina